2022 CONCACAF Women's U-17 Championship qualifying was the qualifying tournament for the 2022 CONCACAF Women's U-17 Championship. Ten teams competed for four spots in the knockout round of the final tournament, where they will join the 16 highest-seeded teams in the competition.

Teams
The 41 CONCACAF teams were ranked based on the CONCACAF Women's Under-17 Ranking as of 1 July 2019. A total of 26 teams entered the tournament after six withdrew due to COVID-19 pandemic restrictions. The highest-ranked 16 entrants were exempt from qualifying and advanced directly to the group stage of the final tournament, while the lowest-ranked 10 entrants entered in the qualifying tournament, where the winners of the three groups and the best runner-up advanced to the round of 16 of the knockout stage of the final tournament.

Notes

Draw
The draw for the group stage took place on 11 June 2021, 11:00 EDT (UTC−4), at the CONCACAF Headquarters in Miami. The 16 teams which initially entered qualifying were drawn into four groups of four teams. After six teams withdrew due to COVID-19 restrictions after the draw, the format was changed into two groups of three and one group of four. Based on the CONCACAF Women's Under-17 Ranking, the initial 16 teams were distributed into four pots, as follows:

(W): Withdrew after draw
Group D was not played due to 
the withdrawal of 3 of the 4 teams from the group before starting qualifications. Guyana, originally in Group D, took a place in Group C.

Qualifying stage
The winners of each group and the best-placed runner-up qualify for the final tournament, where they enter the round of 16 of the knockout stage. All matches were played at IMG Academy, Bradenton in the United States. All times are local, EST (UTC−5).

Tiebreakers
The ranking of teams in each group is determined as follows (Regulations Article 12.3):
Points obtained in all group matches (three points for a win, one for a draw, zero for a loss);
Goal difference in all group matches;
Number of goals scored in all group matches;
Points obtained in the matches played between the teams in question;
Goal difference in the matches played between the teams in question;
Number of goals scored in the matches played between the teams in question;
Fair play points in all group matches:
Yellow card: −1 points;
Indirect red card (two yellow cards): −3 points;
Direct red card: −4 points;
Yellow card and direct red card: −5 points;
Drawing of lots.

Group A

Group B

Group C

Ranking of second-placed teams

Goalscorers

References

External links
Concacaf Women's Under-17 Championship, CONCACAF.com

Women's U-17 Championship qualifying
2021 in women's association football
2021 in youth association football
October 2021 sports events in North America